Cyrus is a 1768 tragedy by the British writer John Hoole.

The original Covent Garden cast included William Powell as Cyrus, William Smith as Cambyses, Robert Bensley as Mithrades, Thomas Hull as Harpargus, Mary Ann Yates as Mandane and Isabella Mattocks as Aspasia.

References

Bibliography
 Nicoll, Allardyce. A History of English Drama 1660–1900: Volume III. Cambridge University Press, 2009.
 Hogan, C.B (ed.) The London Stage, 1660–1800: Volume V. Southern Illinois University Press, 1968.

1768 plays
British plays
Tragedy plays
West End plays